Rakaŭ is an urban settlement in Valozhyn District, Minsk Region, Belarus. Population about 2,100 (2006).

History
The area has been inhabited since ancient times, which was proven when the settlement known as Valy was found on the river Islach. In the 16th century, the ruins were used as a platform for feudal castle building. The Rakaŭ castle can be found on the map created by Tomash Makovski in 1613. In 14th-century documents, settlements near-contemporary Rakaŭ are mentioned for the first time. Rakaŭ itself is mentioned in 15th-century chronicles. In 1465 Casimir Jagiellon gave Rakaŭ as a gift to the chancellor of the Grand Duchy of Lithuania, Mihail Kyazhgailo. Kyazhgailo's family owned Rakaŭ for almost 100 years. In the mid-16th century, Rakaŭ went to the Zavish family as a part of an inheritance. In the 17th century, the village belonged to the Sangushki family. They constructed a Dominican Catholic cloister in 1686 and a wooden castle, the Basilian Uniat cloister, in 1702.

Some sources state that by the end of the 18th century Rakaŭ belonged to the Ogiński family. This period lasted until the January Uprising, which members of the Ogiński family participated in. To punish the Ogińskis for their treachery, the Russian Empress Catherine the Great seized Rakaŭ and gave it to General Saltykov. In 1793, the same year Rakaŭ became part of the Russian Empire, the first stone castle in the city was constructed. After the January Uprising, it was turned into an Orthodox church, which still exists to this day.

In 1804, the Zdzehovsky family bought Rakaŭ from Saltykov, and owned it until 1939. This period marked a time of prosperity for Rakaŭ: in 1843, they opened factories to produce agricultural machines. By 1880, about 16 glass factories operated in Rakaŭ. The village had Magdeburg rights and privileges. There were two watermills, a brick factory, a lumber mill, and a postal telegraph office (its ruins still remain). By the end of the 19th century, the population of Rakaŭ was about 3,600 people, almost 60% of whom were Jews. From 1904 to 1906, the construction of the Church of Saint Virgin Mary and the Holy Spirit Castle was finished. It was built with donations from the local people, and is an example of Neo-Gothic architecture. In 1915, the local citizen Nevah-Girsha Haimov Pozdnyakov organized automobile shipping between Rakaŭ and Zaslawye, a nearby town.

After the Treaty of Riga of 1921 came into effect, Rakaŭ became part of the Second Polish Republic. It was the centre of Wilno Voivodeship. Finally, Rakaŭ become part of the Soviet Union and Belarus in 1939 when the Red Army invaded Poland according to the Molotov–Ribbentrop Pact. On 21 August 1941, a ghetto was established in Rakaŭ. The ghetto lasted until 4 February 1942, when its population was herded into one of the ghetto's four synagogues and burned to death.

Attractions

Glacial conglomerate near the Minsk–Volozhin highway
Ancient settlement
Jewish cemetery (1642)
Our Saviour and Transfiguration Church (1793)
Catholic St. Ann Chapel (1862)
Orthodox cemetery (19th century)
Mother of God Rosaria and the Holy Spirit Kostel (1904–1906)
Crypt and burial vault of Drutskiya-Lubetskiya
Felix Yanushkevich Ethnographic museum

Notable residents
, translator, author of articles on the history of Belarusian literature
, coauthor of a book on the history of Belarusian literature, writer
Avraham Kalmanowitz, Rav of Rakov
Ida Rosenthal, Russian Empire-born American dressmaker and businesswoman who co-founded Maidenform

References

External links

The murder of the Jews of Rakaw during World War II, at Yad Vashem website

Valozhyn District
Agrotowns in Belarus
Minsky Uyezd
Wilno Voivodeship (1926–1939)